Donald Ray Lynam, Jr. (born April 5, 1967) is an American psychologist and distinguished professor of clinical psychology at Purdue University's College of Health and Human Sciences. He is also the director of Purdue's Developmental Psychopathology, Psychopathy and Personality Lab. He previously taught at the University of Kentucky, where he won the American Psychological Association's Distinguished Scientific Early Career Contributions to Psychology Award in 2002. He has been conducting research on psychopathy for over two decades.

References

External links
 Faculty page
 
Donald Lynam website

1967 births
Living people
Purdue University faculty
University of Kentucky faculty
University of Wisconsin–Madison alumni
Psychopathologists
American clinical psychologists